Jigani Hobli is located in Anekal taluk in South Bengaluru, India and is situated at a distance of 28 km from Bangalore city railway station. Some of the features of the place Jigani are that it has a well-established Jigani industrial area and also very near to Electronics City in Bangalore. Several such Government initiatives to improve development to this area in Bangalore has led to growth of population in this area starting 2004. Recently due to an outburst in worker population this place has made , Tamil, and Telugu as more frequently used languages. Companies like HCL, OTIS, APC, Toyota, BuziBrAIns, The Akshayapatra foundation etc. have brought more people to this remote location.

It is one of the industrial areas in Anekal taluk, with others being Attibele, Bommasandra, Chandapura, Electronic City and Sarjapura.

IIM-B second campus
Indian Institute of Management Bangalore has plans for a second campus in Jigani very soon. 

It is also called granite city as a number of granite factories are situated in and around jigani.

References

Neighbourhoods in Bangalore